Metallarcha is a genus of moths of the family Crambidae.

Species
Metallarcha achoeusalis (Walker, 1859)
Metallarcha aureodiscalis (Hampson, 1918)
Metallarcha beatalis (C. Felder, R. Felder & Rogenhofer, 1875)
Metallarcha calliaspis Meyrick, 1884
Metallarcha chrysitis Turner, 1941
Metallarcha crocanthes Lower, 1896
Metallarcha diplochrysa Meyrick, 1884
Metallarcha epichrysa Meyrick, 1884
Metallarcha erromena (Turner, 1908)
Metallarcha eurychrysa Meyrick, 1884
Metallarcha leucodetis (Lower, 1899)
Metallarcha phaenolis Turner, 1913
Metallarcha pseliota Meyrick, 1887
Metallarcha tetraplaca Meyrick, 1887
Metallarcha thiophara Turner, 1917
Metallarcha zygosema Lower, 1897

References

Spilomelinae
Crambidae genera
Taxa named by Edward Meyrick